Nebelschütz (German) or Njebjelčicy (Upper Sorbian) is a Sorbian village in the district of Bautzen of Saxony in south-east Germany. It lies to the south-east of Kamenz.

The municipality is part of the recognized Sorbian settlement area in Saxony. Upper Sorbian has an official status next to German, all villages bear names in both languages. In 2004, two thirds of the population spoke Sorbian.

The town is dominated by the Baroque church of St Martin, which stands on high ground. Whilst mildly impressive from the outside the church is more noted for its magnificent interior.

The church has a curious combination of both pulpit and altar, reflecting the Catholic dominance within the Sorbian area.

History

The village is first mentioned in 1304 in a document written in the nearby monastery of Panschwitz-Kuckau.

Twin cities 
  Hlučín, Moravian–Silesian Region, Czech Republic

References 

Populated places in Bautzen (district)